Joseph Millson (born 27 April 1974) is an English actor and singer. He trained at the Rose Bruford College of Speech and Drama in Sidcup, London.

Personal life
Millson married singer and actress Caroline Fitzgerald in the summer of 1999. The two had two children, Jessica and Gabriel. In October 2012, it was reported in various media outlets that they had separated.

Millson met his second wife Sarah-Jane Potts in 2011 while they were cast members on Holby City, a medical drama television series. The two married on 31 December 2013. Millson has a stepson, Buster, from Potts' first's marriage to actor Tony Denman.

Filmography

{| class="wikitable"
|+ Television and film
|-
! Year
! Title
! Role
! Notes
|-
| 1996 || La Belle Dame sans Merci by John Keats|| Knight at Arms||Film
|-
| 1998 || In Exile || Raphael || 1 episode
|-
| 1999–2001 || Peak Practice || Dr Sam Morgan || 49 episodes
|-
| 2001 || Lily Savage's Blankety Blank || Himself || 1 episode
|-
| rowspan=2| 2002 || EastEnders || Jason James|| 6 episodes
|-
| Holby City || Paul Fry || 1 episode
|-
| 2003 || Doctors || Steve Parkinson || 1 episode
|-
| rowspan=2| 2005 || ShakespeaRe-Told || Billy Banquo || Episode: Macbeth|-
| The Ghost Squad || DS Vinny Thomas || 1 episode
|-
| rowspan=2| 2006 || New Tricks || Tom Christie || 1 episode
|-
| Casino Royale || MI6 Agent Carter || Film
|-
| 2007–2008 || The Sarah Jane Adventures || Alan Jackson || 12 episodes
|-
| 2007 || Talk to Me || Woody || 4 episodes
|-
| rowspan=4| 2008 || Midsomer Murders || James Parkes || S 11 ep 6
|-
| Harley Street || Jeff Turner || 1 episode
|-
| Survivors || Jimmy Garland || 1 episode
|-
| Telstar: The Joe Meek Story || Doctor || Film
|-
| rowspan=3| 2009 || Ashes to Ashes || Dr Battleford || 1 episode
|-
| Comedy Showcase || Matthew Beer || 1 episode, "Campus"
|-
| Enid || Hanly Blyton || Television film
|-
| 2010 || S.N.U.B! || Bomb disposal NCO || Film
|-
| 2011 || Reunited || Martin || Pilot
|-
| rowspan=3| 2011 || Campus || Matthew Beer || 6 episodes
|-
| The Romantics || Lord Byron || Film
|-
| Mount Pleasant || Mark || 1 episode
|-
| 2011–2013 || Holby City || Luc Hemingway || 32 episodes
|-
|rowspan=2| 2013 || I Give It a Year || Charlie || Film
|-
| The Dead 2: India || Nicholas Burton || Film
|-
| 2014 || 24: Live Another Day || Derrick Yates || 3 episodes
|-
| rowspan=2| 2015 || Banished || Major Ross ||
|-
|Penny Dreadful|| Captain Branson ||
|-
| 2015–2020 || The Last Kingdom || Aelfric || Recurring role
|-
| rowspan=4| 2018 || AmeriCAN || Jim Mitchel || 1 episode
|-
| Tango One|| Andrew Hathaway  || Film
|-
| Ransom|| Keith Taylor || 1 episode
|-
| All the Devil's Men || Tony Deighton ||
|-
|2019
|Dragonheart: Vengeance|Darius
|Film
|-
|2019
|Angel Has Fallen|FBI Agent Ramirez
|Film
|-
|2022
|Moon Knight|Dr. Grant
|1 episode
|}

Theatre

Critical receptionFinancial Times'' critic in May 2006:
"I have seen actors from Alan Bates to Matthew Macfadyen play Shakespeare’s Benedick, but Joseph Millson’s performance in the new RSC production strikes me as definitive. Handsome in voice and in person, he can carry the audience on his roar and draw it into his hush. The elements of wit, anger and vulnerability are thrillingly mixed in this actor".

References

External links

Official website

English male television actors
English male stage actors
English male film actors
English male Shakespearean actors
Royal Shakespeare Company members
1974 births
Living people
Male actors from Berkshire
Alumni of Rose Bruford College
20th-century English male actors
21st-century English male actors